The India women's national rugby union team is a national sporting side that represents India in women's international rugby union. They played their first test match against Singapore in 2018. They have only played four Tests to date and are currently ranked 45th by World Rugby.

Record

Overall 

(Full internationals only)

Full internationals

References

External links
 The Official Website of Indian Rugby
 IRB World Rankings
 India on rugbydata.com
 Indian Rugby Internationals

Rugby union in India
Asian national women's rugby union teams
Rugby union
Women's national rugby union teams